Time to Pee! is a children's picture book by Mo Willems.  Published in 2003 by Hyperion Books, it is a book about toilet training. It also contains a progress chart and a page of motivational stickers. The book's instructions are presented by a group of mice that are shown toting signs and banners. Willems joked in an interview, "My basic theory was that kids will never listen to adults, but they will listen to an infestation of mice."

A sequel, Time to Say "Please"!, focusing on manners, was released in 2005.

Reception
The book was generally well received by critics. Horn Book Magazine's Kitty Flynn remarked that "the book was perfectly attuned to preschoolers' sensibilities and funny bones," while Kris Jensen of the Grand Forks Herald called it "an adorable little book, just right . . . for both the Rosemond and Brazelton camps". Janis Campbell of the Detroit Free Press described it as "a funny and straightforward guide", having added, "[P]ublishers have recognized this milestone and you might as well have handled it with humor".  The book was even reviewed by Entertainment Weekly, who remarked, "Surely this book would whiz straight to the top."

Other editions
In addition to a hardcover edition, Time to Pee! is also available as a board book edition, released in March 2020.

See also
Toilet training
What's Your Poo Telling You?

Notes

American picture books
2003 children's books
Children's non-fiction books
Books about toilet training
Books about mice and rats